
Silaces (also spelled Sillakes) was a Parthian commander who fought against the Roman general and triumvir Marcus Licinius Crassus. Initially the satrap of Ichnae, a fortress in Mesopotamia, he was defeated and wounded by Crassus' forces, and fled to the Parthian court, where he informed king Orodes II of the Roman invasion. Silaces later commanded the Parthian contingent alongside Surena at the Battle of Carrhae in 53 BC, where Crassus was defeated and killed. Crassus' defeat at Carrhae was one of the worst military defeats of Roman history. Parthia's victory cemented its reputation as a formidable if not equal power with Rome. While Orodes and Artavasdes II of Armenia were observing a play of The Bacchae of Euripides (c. 480–406 BC) at the Armenian court in honor of the wedding of Orodes' son Pacorus I and Artavasdes' sister, Silaces announced the news of the victory at Carrhae, and put the head of Crassus at Orodes' feet. The head was given to the producer of the play, who decided to use Crassus' actual severed head in place of the stage-prop head of Pentheus.

References

Bibliography

Ancient works 
Plutarch, Parallel Lives
Cassius Dio, Roman History

Modern works 
 .
 .

Further reading 
 

Generals of the Parthian Empire
People of the Roman–Parthian Wars
1st-century BC Iranian people